Kavuluru is a village in the Nallajerla Mandal, West Godavari district of Andhra Pradesh in India.

References

Villages in West Godavari district.